Javelin Boot was a band formed in Texas in 1978 by guitarist Dan O'Neill, bassist Blake Patterson, and drummer David Mider. Described as "one of Austin's premier pop bands" by the Austin American-Statesman, they released the albums The Schwa Sound and The Mauve Album in 1988 and 1989, before moving on to Pravda Records, where they released "For Those About to Pop" and "Fundamentally Sound". Additionally, their music has been used in television episodes of Melrose Place and Party of Five (reference: Chicago Daily Herald). They broke up in 1998.

References

External links
 http://www.austinchronicle.com/gyrobase/AMDB/Profile?oid=oid:200961
"New Javelin Boot disc an infectious pop treat", Andy Smith, July 14, 1994, Austin American-Statesman p. 6.
"Javelin Boot's 'Fundamentally Sound'a real kick", Dan Kening, January 3, 1997, Daily Herald (Time Out Section), p. 8
"Party of Three: Party Circuit Veterans, Javelin Boot," Ken Lieck, November 29, 1996, "Austin Chronicle" https://www.austinchronicle.com/music/1996-11-29/525702/
"Eric Johnson, Stevie Ray Score at Austin Music Awards," John T. Davis, "Billboard" March 28, 1992 https://www.americanradiohistory.com/Archive-Billboard/90s/1992/Billboard-1992-03-28.pdf

"Javelin Boot: Fundamentally Sound," George Graham, http://georgegraham.com/javelin.html
"Javelin Boot: Fundamentally Sound," by Stephen Thompson, AV Club, https://music.avclub.com/javelin-boot-fundamentally-sound-1798193480

Musical groups from Austin, Texas
Musical groups established in 1978
Musical groups disestablished in 1998
1978 establishments in Texas